Route 139 is a north/south highway on the south shore of the Saint Lawrence River. Its northern terminus is in Saint-Nicéphore, now part of Drummondville, at the junction of Route 143, and the southern terminus is in Abercorn at the border with Richford, Vermont at the Richford–Abercorn Border Crossing.

Municipalities along Route 139

 Abercorn
 Sutton
 Brome Lake
 Cowansville
 East Farnham
 Brigham
 Bromont
 Saint-Alphonse-de-Granby
 Granby
 Roxton Pond
 Roxton
 Roxton Falls
 Acton Vale
 Saint-Théodore-d'Acton
 Wickham
 Saint-Nicéphore (Drummondville)

Major intersections

See also
 List of Quebec provincial highways

References

External links 
 Provincial Route Map (Courtesy of the Quebec Ministry of Transportation) 
 Route 139 on Google Maps

139
Transport in Granby, Quebec
Transport in Drummondville